Choi Won-hyeong is a South Korean voice actor who joined the Munhwa Broadcasting Corporation's Voice Acting Division in 1993.

Roles

Theatrical Animation
The Rescuers Down Under - Jake
A Goofy Movie - Max Goof
The Lion King II: Simba's Pride - Kovu
Ratatouille - Linguini
Toy Story 3 - Ken
Frozen - Hans Westergaard

Broadcast TV
Hell Girl - Gilles de L'Enfer
24 (replacing Carlos Bernard, Korea TV Edition, MBC)
Miracle Girls (Korea TV Edition, MBC)
Vectorman (Korea TV Edition, KBS)
Maxman (Korea TV Edition, KBS)
Surprise Mystery TV (narration, MBC)
Jinsil Game (narration, SBS)
Cybertron (Korea TV Edition, SBS)
Dr. Slump (Korea TV Edition, MBC)
Red Baron (Korea TV Edition, MBC)
Komi's Cartoon Curiosity Heaven (SBS)
Erementar Gerad (Korea TV Edition, Tooniverse) - Coud Van Ciruet
MÄR (Korea TV Edition, Tooniverse) - Nanashi
To Heart (Korea TV Edition, Tooniverse) - Hiroyuki Fujita
City Hunter (Korea TV Edition, Tooniverse) - Hideyuki Makimura
Toaru Majutsu no Index - Tōma Kamijō

Live Action Films
The Fast and The Furious (replacing Paul Walker, Korea TV Edition, MBC)
All the Pretty Horses (replacing Billy Bob Thornton, Korea TV Edition, MBC)
Hidalgo (replacing Viggo Mortensen, Korea TV Edition, MBC)
Around the World in 80 Days (replacing Steve Coogan, Korea TV Edition, MBC)
The Big Hit (replacing Mark Wahlberg, Korea TV Edition, SBS)

Games
The War of Genesis III Part.2. - Demian von Prios
Grand Chase - Asin
Elsword - In
World of Warcraft - Kalecgos (~ World of Warcraft: Warlords of Draenor), Varo'then
Digimon Masters - Marcus Damon
Sly Cooper 1, 2 - Bentley Wiseturtle
MapleStory
Demon (in game)
MapleStory Surprise Mystery TV official parody YouTube videos (Chapter 1. A Story Has Not Ended, Chapter 3. The City of God, Cernium)
Diablo III: Reaper of Souls
Yu-Gi-Oh! Duel Links - Hiroto Honda / Tristan Taylor
Cookie Run: Kingdom - Dark Choco Cookie

Awards
2007 MBC Drama Awards, Best TV Voice Actor (CSI: NY)

See also
Munhwa Broadcasting Corporation
MBC Voice Acting Division

External links
Naver My-Home Voice Actor Choi Won Hyeong Homepage 
Daum Cafe Voice Actor Choi Won Hyeong Homepage 
MBC Voice Acting division Choi Won Hyeong blog

References

1968 births
Living people
South Korean male voice actors